Harold Sparkes (1896 – 3 June 1917) was an English amateur footballer who played as a centre forward in the Football League for Glossop.

Personal life 
Sparkes took an apprenticeship as a plumber and later worked as a clerk. On 11 June 1915, 10 months after the outbreak of the First World War, he enlisted as a private in the Royal Scots. After being posted to France in October 1915, he saw action at the Battle of Loos and later suffered a gunshot wound to the head near Ploegsteert, Belgium on 12 May 1916. After recovering in Britain, he returned to the Western Front in December 1916. Sparkes was killed east of Arras, France on 3 June 1917, during the Battle of Arleux. He is commemorated on the Arras Memorial.

Career statistics

References

1896 births
People from Glossop
Footballers from Derbyshire
English footballers
Association football forwards
English Football League players
British Army personnel of World War I
Royal Scots soldiers
1917 deaths
Glossop North End A.F.C. players
British military personnel killed in World War I
McCrae's Battalion
British shooting survivors
Date of birth unknown